The Fashion Awards, known as the British Fashion Awards until 2016, is an annual ceremony established in the United Kingdom in 1989 to showcase both British and international individuals and businesses who have made the most outstanding contributions to the fashion industry during the year. The ceremony is organized by the British Fashion Council, and is the primary fundraiser for the BFC's Education Foundation; a charity that promotes excellence in design by financially supporting students with the ability and potential to make an exceptional contribution to the fashion industry.

The BFC Support Initiatives

 BFC/Vogue Designer Fashion Fund,
 BFC/GQ Designer Menswear Fund Supported by JD.com, Inc
 NEWGEN,
 Positive Fashion,
 Coronavirus Foundation Fashion Fund,
 The Black in Fashion Council.

History and notable events 
Originally named the British Fashion Awards, the first Fashion Awards ceremony took place on 17 October 1989 and was attended by Princess Diana, who wore a Catherine Walker gown especially for the occasion.

Alexander McQueen receives posthumous award 

In 2010 four-time winner of British Designer of the Year award, Alexander McQueen received the award for Outstanding Achievement in Fashion Design in recognition of his illustrious career.

Stylist Isabella Blow remembered 

In 2007 the Fashion Creator Award is renamed Isabella Blow Award for Fashion Creator in honour of Isabella Blow, who died on 7 May 2007. Blow was renowned for her unerring support of British designers and for her contribution to the international fashion industry as a whole.

Current Award categories

Designer of the Year 
Recognises an international designer whose innovative collections have made a notable impact on the industry, defining the shape of global fashion.

Accessories Designer of the Year 
Celebrates a designer that has proven instrumental in elevating accessories to the forefront of the fashion industry, demonstrating a skill for both creativity and commerce, and establishing their brand as a global fashion leader.

Business Leader 
This award recognises the work of a CEO or President of a fashion business who has overseen both creative and commercial success in the past year. With a natural aptitude to nurture both creative talent and commercial growth, the "Business Leader" enables creative freedom alongside financial stability, which in turn generates innovation and excitement within the industry and beyond.

Urban Luxe Award 
Celebrating the innovation and influence of a contemporary apparel brand, the recipient of this award has redefined the way "sportswear" is perceived across the globe, elevating "casual" to high end and directional fashion.

British Emerging Talent - Womenswear 
Recognising new British womenswear talent, this award celebrates a British-based womenswear or accessories designer who over the last 12 months has had a major creative impact on global fashion.

British Emerging Talent - Menswear 
Celebrating emerging talent in British menswear, this award recognises the innovation and creative influence from a British-based menswear or accessories designer, whose collections have gained international attention this year.

British Designer of the Year - Womenswear 
Celebrating a British womenswear designer that has been instrumental in innovating and leading women's fashion over the last year – excelling both creatively and commercially, creating an impressive footprint on the global fashion stage.

British Designer of the Year - Menswear 
Recognises a leading British menswear designer who has consistently made a global impact with their innovative and creative designs, shaping the burgeoning international menswear landscape.

Model of the Year 
Recognises the global impact of a model, male or female, who over the last 12 months has dominated the industry. With an influence that transcends the catwalk, the Model of The Year has made an outstanding contribution to the industry, garnering numerous editorial and advertising campaigns throughout the year.

Outstanding achievement 
The Outstanding Achievement Award celebrates the overwhelming creative contribution of an individual to the fashion industry, who throughout their illustrious career has constantly shaped and reshaped the fashion world through their innovation and creativity. Their influence has reached far beyond the industry, influencing the way the general public perceive and consume fashion. This timeless visionary remains an inspiration to both peers and protégés alike.

Swarovski Award for Positive Change 
The Swarovski Award for Positive Change recognises and celebrates brands or individuals who promote the welfare of others and generously use their resources to benefit good causes.

Isabella Blow Award for Fashion Creator 
Recognising the very best innovators and creatives in fashion, this award celebrates invaluable contributions that have changed the entire fashion landscape. With a discerning eye and incessant drive, this creative has brought designers' creations to life and helped create worlds within brands. Their dedication to the craft has attracted legions of fans and the incredible body of work has already left an indelible mark on the entire industry.

Past Award Winners

2019 awards

2018 awards

2017 awards

2016 awards 
{| class="wikitable" style="font-size:90%; text-align:left"
    Award
    Winner
  </tr>
  British Menswear Designer of the Year
    Craig Green for Craig Green
  
      British Womenswear Designer of the Year
    Simone Rocha for Simone Rocha
  
      British Emerging Talent 
    Molly Goddard
  
      The Swarovski Award for Positive Change 
    Franca Sozzani
  
      Isabella Blow Award for Fashion Creator 
    Bruce Weber
  
      Special Recognition 
    100 Years of British Vogue
  
      British Brand 
    Alexander McQueen
  
      International Business Leader
    Marco Bizzarri for Gucci
  
      International Urban Luxury Brand 
    Vetements
  
      International Accessories Designer 
    Alessandro Michele for Gucci
  
      International Ready-to-Wear Designer 
    Demna Gvasalia for Balenciaga
  
      International Model 
    Gigi Hadid
  
      New Fashion Icon 
    Jaden & Willow Smith
  
      Outstanding Achievement 
    Ralph Lauren
  
  <tr>    
   
</table>

2015 awards 
{| class="wikitable" style="font-size:90%; text-align:left"
      Award
    Winner
  
  Menswear Designer of The Year 
    JW Anderson
  
      Womenswear Designer of The Year 
    JW Anderson
  
      Emerging Womenswear Designer 
    Thomas Tait
  
      Emerging Menswear Designer 
    Grace Wales Bonner
  
      Emerging Accessory Designer 
    Jordan Askill
  
      Red Carpet 
    Tom Ford
  
      Model 
    Jourdan Dunn
  
      Outstanding Achievement Award 
    Karl Lagerfeld
  
      Creative Campaign 
    Burberry
  
      International Designer 
    Alessandro Michele for Gucci
  
      New Establishment Designer 
    Mary Katrantzou
  
      Establishment Designer 
    Erdem
  
      Brand 
    Stella McCartney
  
      Isabella Blow Award for Fashion Creator
    Nick Knight
  
      British Style - Red Carpet Ambassador 
    Gwendoline Christie
  
      British Style - Fashion Innovator 
    FKA Twigs
  
      Accessory Designer 
    Charlotte Olympia
  
  <tr>    
   
</table>

2014 awards 
{| class="wikitable" style="font-size:90%; text-align:left"

      Award
    Winner
  
      Menswear Designer of The Year 
    J.W. Anderson
  
      Womenswear Designer of The Year 
    Erdem
  
      Emerging Womenswear Designer 
    Marques'Almeida
  
      Emerging Menswear Designer 
    Craig Green
  
      Emerging Accessory Designer 
    Prism
  
      Red Carpet Designer 
    Alexander McQueen
  
      Model 
    Cara Delevingne
  
      Special Recognition Award 
    Chris Moore
  
      Isabella Blow Award for Fashion Creator 
    Edward Enninful
  
      International Designer 
    Nicolas Ghesquiere for Louis Vuitton
  
      Outstanding Achievement Award 
    Anna Wintour OBE
  
      Creative Campaign 
    Louis Vuitton
  
      New Establishment Designer 
    Simone Rocha
  
      Establishment Designer 
    Preen
  
      Brand 
    Victoria Beckham
  
      British Style Award 
    Emma Watson
  
      Accessory Designer 
    Anya Hindmarch
  
  <tr>    
   
</table>

2013 awards 
{| class="wikitable" style="font-size:90%; text-align:left"
    Award
    Winner
  </tr>    Menswear Designer of The Year 
    Christopher Bailey For Burberry
  
      Womenswear Designer of The Year 
    Christopher Kane
  
      Emerging Womenswear Designer 
    Simone Rocha
  
      Emerging Menswear Designer 
    Agi & Sam
  
      Emerging Accessories Designer 
    Sophia Webster
  
      Isabella Blow Award for Fashion Creator 
    Lady Amanda Harlech
  
      Model of The Year 
    Edie Campbell
  
      International Designer of The Year 
    Miuccia Prada For Prada
  
      Red Carpet Award 
    Erdem
  
      New Establishment Designer of The Year 
    J.W. Anderson
  
      Brand of The Year 
    Burberry
  
      British Style Award Brought to You by Vodafone 
    Harry Styles
  
      Accessory Designer of The Year 
    Nicholas Kirkwood
  
      BFC Outstanding Achievement Award 
    Terry and Tricia Jones
  
      Special Recognition Award 
    Kate Moss
  
      Special Recognition Award 
    Suzy Menkes   
  
  <tr>    
   
</table>

2012 awards 
{| class="wikitable" style="font-size:90%; text-align:left"
      Award
    Winner
  
  Designer of The Year 
    Stella McCartney
  </tr>
      British Style Award
    Alexa Chung
  
      Emerging Talent Award - Ready-To-Wear 
    J.W. Anderson
  
      Emerging Talent Award - Menswear 
    Jonathan Saunders
  
      Red Carpet Award 
    Roksanda Ilincic
  
      Emerging Talent - Accessories 
    Sophie Hulme
  
      Accessory Designer 
    Nicholas Kirkwood
  
      Designer Brand 
    Stella McCartney
  
      Isabella Blow Award for Fashion Creator 
    Louise Wilson
  
      Model 
    Cara Delevingne
  
      New Establishment Award 
    Erdem
  
      Menswear Designer 
    Kim Jones For Louis Vuitton
  
      BFC Outstanding Achievement in Fashion 
    Manolo Blahnik CBE
  
      Special Recognition Award 
    Harold Tillman
  
  <tr>    
   
</table>

2011 awards 
{| class="wikitable" style="font-size:90%; text-align:left"
      Award
    Winner
  
  Designer of The Year 
    Sarah Burton For Alexander McQueen
  </tr>
      Emerging Talent Award - Ready-To-Wear 
    Mary Katrantzou
  
      Emerging Talent Award - Accessories 
    Tabitha Simmons
  
      Emerging Talent Award - Menswear 
    Christopher Raeburn
  
      Model 
    Stella Tennant
  
      Designer Brand 
    Victoria Beckham
  
      British Style Award 
    Alexa Chung
  
      Isabella Blow Award for Fashion Creator 
    Sam Gainsbury
  
      Red Carpet Award 
    Stella McCartney
  
      Accessory Designer
    Charlotte Olympia
  
      New Establishment Award 
    Christopher Kane
  
  <tr>    
   
</table>

2010 awards 
{| class="wikitable" style="font-size:90%; text-align:left"
      Award
    Winner
  
     Designer of the Year 
    Phoebe Philo for Celine
  </tr>
      BFC Outstanding Achievement in Fashion
    Alexander McQueen
  
      Accessory Designer 
    Nicholas Kirkwood
  
      Model 
    Lara Stone
  
      Menswear Designer 
    E. Tautz
  
      Emerging Talent Award - Ready-to-Wear 
    Meadham Kirchhoff
  
      Emerging Talent Award - Accessories 
    Husam El Odeh
  
      Special Recognition 
    Naomi Campbell
  
      Digital Innovation 
    Burberry
  
      British Style 
    Alexa Chung
  
      Isabella Blow Award for Fashion Creator 
    Nicola Formichetti
  
      Designer Brand 
    Mulberry
  
  <tr>    
   
</table>

2009 awards 
{| class="wikitable" style="font-size:90%; text-align:left"
      Award
    Winner
  
    BFC Designer of the Year
    Christopher Bailey
  </tr>
      Swarovski Emerging Talent Award for Accessories 
    Holly Fulton
  
      Swarovski Emerging Talent Award for Ready-to-Wear 
    Peter Pilotto
  
      Designer Brand 
    Burberry
  
      Model 
    Georgia Jagger
  
      Accessory Designer 
    Katie Hillier
  
      Menswear Designer 
    Kim Jones for Dunhill
  
      BFC Outstanding Achievement in Fashion Design 
    John Galliano
  
      London 25 
    Kate Moss
  
      Isabella Blow Award for Fashion Creator 
    Grace Coddington
  
      BFC British Collection of the Year
    Christopher Kane
  
  <tr>    
   
</table>

2008 awards 
{| class="wikitable" style="font-size:90%; text-align:left"
      Award
    Winner
  
    
    Designer of the Year 
    Luella Bartley
  </tr>
      Outstanding Achievement 
    Stephen Jones
  
      Swarovski Emerging Talent Award  - Accessories 
    Nicholas Kirkwood
  
      Swarovski Emerging Talent Award - Ready to Wear 
    Louise Goldin
  
      Menswear Designer
    Christopher Bailey for Burberry
  
      Red Carpet Designer 
    Matthew Williamson
  
      Isabella Blow Award for Fashion Creator 
    Tim Walker
  
      Designer Brand
    Jimmy Choo
  
      Accessory Designer 
    Rupert Sanderson
  
      Model
    Jourdan Dunn
  
      Bespoke
    Richard James
  
  <tr>    
   
</table>

2007 awards 
{| class="wikitable" style="font-size:90%; text-align:left"
  
    Award
    Winner
  </tr>
       Designer of the Year 
    Stella McCartney
  </tr>
      Red Carpet Designer 
    Marchesa
  
      New Generation Designer 
    Christopher Kane
  
      Accessory Designer
    Tom Binns
  
      Best New Retail Concept 
    Marc Jacobs
  
      Menswear Designer
    Christopher Bailey for Burberry
  
      Model 
    Agyness Deyn
  
      Designer Brand 
    Anya Hindmarch
  
      BFC Award for Outstanding Achievement in Fashion Design 
    Dame Vivienne Westwood
  
      BFC Enterprise Award (sponsor: Swarovski) 
    Erdem
  
      Isabella Blow Award for Fashion Creation
    Michael Howells   
  
  <tr>    
   
</table>

2006 awards 
{| class="wikitable" style="font-size:90%; text-align:left"
      Award
    Winner
  
       Designer of the Year 
    Giles Deacon
  </tr>
      Red Carpet Designer 
    Vivienne Westwood
  
      New Generation Designer 
    Marios Schwab
  
      Accessory Designer 
    Stuart Vevers for Mulberry
  
      Retailer 
    B Store
  
      Menswear Designer 
    Kim Jones
  
      Model of the Year 
    Kate Moss
  
      V&A Award for Outstanding Achievement in Fashion
    Joan Burstein CBE
  
      Fashion Creator 
    Eugene Souleiman
  
      BFC Fashion Enterprise 
    Jonathan Saunders
  
  <tr>    
   
</table>

2005 awards 
{| class="wikitable" style="font-size:90%; text-align:left"
      Award
    Winner
  
    Designer of the Year 
    Christopher Bailey
  </tr>
      Red Carpet Designer 
    Roland Mouret
  
      New Generation Designer 
    Duro Olowu
  
      Accessory Designer 
    Stephen Jones
  
      Retailer 
    Dover Street Market
  
      Menswear Designer
    Carlo Brandelli for Kilgour
  
      Model of the Year 
    Karen Elson
  
      V&A Award for Outstanding Achievement in Fashion 
    Suzy Menkes OBE
  
      Fashion Creator 
    Charlotte Tilbury
  
  <tr>    
   
</table>

2004 awards 
{| class="wikitable" style="font-size:90%; text-align:left"

      Award
    Winner
  
     Designer of the Year 
    Phoebe Philo
  </tr>
      New Designer 
    Giles Deacon
  
      Accessory Designer 
    Mulberry
  
      Retailer 
    Net-a-Porter
  
      Menswear Designer 
    Alexander McQueen
  
      Model of the Year 
    Lily Cole
  
      V&A Award for Outstanding Achievement in Fashion 
    David Bailey
  
      Fashion Creator
    Pat McGrath
  
  <tr>    
   
</table>

2003 awards 
{| class="wikitable" style="font-size:90%; text-align:left"

      Award
    Winner
  
  Designer of the Year 
    Alexander McQueen
  </tr>
      New Generation Designer
    Sophia Kokosalaki
  
      Accessory Designer 
    Manolo Blahnik CBE
  
      Glamour Designer 
    Julien Macdonald
  
      Contemporary Designer 
    Paul Smith
  
      High Street Fashion Retailer 
    Reiss
  
      Menswear Designer 
    Paul Smith
  
      British Journalist of the Year 
    Hilary Alexander
  
      Most Stylish Photographer
    Mario Testino
  
      Most Stylish Model 
    Erin O'Connor
  
      Stylist 
    Katie Grand
  
      Female TV Personality 
    Kim Cattrall
  
      Male TV Personality 
    Ant & Dec
  
      Movie Actress 
    Minnie Driver
  
      Movie Actor 
    Ewan McGregor
  
      Male Music Artist 
    Robbie Williams
  
      Female Music Artist 
    Victoria Beckham
  
      Sports Personality 
    David Beckham
  
  <tr>    
   
</table>

2002 awards 
No awards given

2001 awards 
{| class="wikitable" style="font-size:90%; text-align:left"
      Award
    Winner
  
  Designer of the Year 
    Alexander McQueen
  </tr>
      Glamour Designer
    Julien Macdonald
  
      Classic Designer 
    Paul Smith
  
      Contemporary Designer 
    Burberry
  
      Accessory Designer 
    Anya Hindmarch
  
      Street Style 
    i.e. uniform
  
      New Generation Designer 
    Stella McCartney
  
      Retailer 
    Topshop
  
      Journalist 
    Lisa Armstrong
  
      Stylist 
    Lucinda Chambers
  
      Model 
    Kate Moss
  
      Menswear
    Richard James
  
      Rover People's Award
    Jemima Khan
  
  <tr>    
</table>

2000 awards 
{| class="wikitable" style="font-size:90%; text-align:left"
      Award
    Winner
  
  
  Designer of the Year 
    Hussein Chalayan
  </tr>
      Glamour Designer 
    Stella McCartney
  
      Classic Design 
    Burberry
  
      Contemporary Design 
    Joseph
  
      Accessory Designer 
    Jimmy Choo
  
      Street Style 
    Maharishi
  
      New Generation Designer 
    Tracey Boyd
  
      Retailer 
    Topshop
  
      Journalist 
    Mimi Spencer
  
      Stylist 
    Katy England
  
      Menswear Designer 
    Ozwald Boateng
  
      Rover People's Award
    Alexander McQueen
  
  <tr>
   
</table>

1999 awards 
{| class="wikitable" style="font-size:90%; text-align:left"
      Award
    Winner
  
  Designer of the Year 
    Hussein Chalayan
  </tr>
      Hall of Fame 
    Vidal Sassoon
  
      Classic Design
    Burberry
  
      Contemporary Designer 
    Betty Jackson
  
      Accessory Designer 
    Manolo Blahnik CBE
  
      Street Style 
    YMC
  
      New Generation Designer 
    Elspeth Gibson
  
      Retailer
    French Connection
  
      Journalist 
    Suzy Menkes
  
      Glamour Designer
    English Eccentrics
  
      Stylist 
    Lucinda Chambers
  
      Menswear
    Paul Smith
  
            
  <tr>    
   
</table>

1998 awards 
No awards given

1997 awards 
{| class="wikitable" style="font-size:90%; text-align:left"
      Award
    Winner
  
    Designer of the Year 
    Alexander McQueen & John Galliano
  </tr>
      Hall of Fame 
    Clinton Silver
  
      Classic Design
    John Smedley
  
      Contemporary Designer 
    Nicole Farhi
  
      Accessory Designer 
    Philip Treacy
  
      Street Style 
    Red or Dead
  
      New Generation Designer 
    Antonio Berardi
  
      Retailer 
    Jigsaw
  
      Journalist 
    Hilary Alexander
  
      Glamour Designer
    Pearce Fionda
  
      Menswear Designer
    Paul Smith
  
  <tr>    
</table>

1996 awards 
{| class="wikitable" style="font-size:90%; text-align:left"
      Award
    Winner
  
   Designer of the Year 
    Alexander McQueen
  </tr>
      Hall of Fame 
    Lady Mary Henderson
  
      Classic Design 
    Jaeger
  
      Contemporary Designer 
    Nicole Farhi
  
      Accessory Designer 
    Philip Treacy
  
      Street Style 
    Red or Dead
  
      New Generation Designer 
    Clements Ribiero
  
      Design-led retail 
    Oasis
  
      Journalist 
    Iain R. Webb
  
      Glamour Designer 
    Amanda Wakeley
  
      Fashion Personality
    Kate Moss
  
  <tr>
  
</table>

1995 awards 
{| class="wikitable" style="font-size:90%; text-align:left"

      Award
    Winner
  
  Designer of the Year 
    John Galliano
  </tr>
      Hall of Fame 
    Zandra Rhodes
  
      Classic Design 
    Marks & Spencer
  
      Contemporary Designer 
    Nicole Farhi
  
      Accessory Designer 
    Patrick Cox
  
      Street Style 
    Red or Dead
  
      New Generation Designer 
    Pearce Fionda
  
      Design-led retail 
    Oasis
  
      Journalist 
    Iain R. Webb
  
      Glamour Designer
    Ben De Lisi
  
  <tr>    
   
</table>

1994 awards 
{| class="wikitable" style="font-size:90%; text-align:left"
      Award
    Winner
  
   Designer of the Year 
    John Galliano
  </tr>
      Hall of Fame 
    Jean Muir
  
      Glamour Designer
    Ben De Lisi
  
      Classic Design 
    Marks & Spencer
  
      Accessory Designer 
    Patrick Cox
  
      Knitwear Design
    Joseph
  
      More Dash than Cash 
    French Connection
  
      New Generation Designer
    Copperwheat Blundell
  
      Design led retail
    Whistles
  
  <tr>   
   
</table>

1993 awards 
{| class="wikitable" style="font-size:90%; text-align:left"
      Award
    Winner
  
    Designer of the Year 
    John Rocha
  </tr>
      More Dash than Cash 
    French Connection
  
      Classic Design 
    Jaeger
  
      Knitwear Design 
    Joseph
  
      Accessory Designer 
    Philip Treacy
  
      New Generation Designer 
    Abe Hamilton
  
      Design led retail 
    Whistles
  
      Glamour Designer
    Amanda Wakeley
  
  <tr>      
   
</table>

1992 awards 
{| class="wikitable" style="font-size:90%; text-align:left"
      Award
    Winner
  
     Designer of the Year 
    Rifat Ozbek
  </tr>
      Glamour Designer 
    Amanda Wakeley
  
      Classic Design 
    Mulberry
  
      Knitwear Design 
    Joseph
  
      Accessory Designer 
    Philip Treacy
  
      New Generation Designer 
    Flyte Ostell
  
      More Dash than Cash 
    Monix
  
      Hall of Fame
    Sir Edward Rayne
  
  <tr>   
   
</table>

1991 awards 
{| class="wikitable" style="font-size:90%; text-align:left"
      Award
    Winner
  
    
    Designer of the Year 
    Vivienne Westwood
  </tr>
      Hall of Fame 
    Beatrix Miller
  
      New Generation Designer 
    Bella Freud
  
      Accessory Designer 
    Philip Treacy
  
      More Dash than Cash 
    Monix
  
      Ready-to-Wear Designer 
    John Smedley
  
      Classic Designer 
    Jasper Conran
  
      Glamour Designer
    Catherine Walker
  
  <tr>   
   
</table>

1990 awards 
{| class="wikitable" style="font-size:90%; text-align:left"
      Award
    Winner
  
     Designer of the Year 
    Vivienne Westwood
  </tr>
      Hall of Fame 
    Mary Quant
  
      Classic Design 
    Joseph
  
      Knitwear Design 
    Joseph
  
      Accessory Designer 
    Manolo Blahnik 
  
      More Dash than Cash
    Jigsaw
  
      Innovative Design 
    Helen Storey
  
      British Couture Designer
    Catherine Walker
  
      Glamour Designer
    Rifat Ozbek
  
  <tr>    
   
</table>

1989 awards 
{| class="wikitable" style="font-size:90%; text-align:left"
      Award
    Winner
  
     Designer of the Year 
    Workers for Freedom
  </tr>
      Hall of Fame 
    Hardy Amies
  
      Classic Designer
    Nicole Farhi
  
      Contemporary Design
    Jigsaw
  
      Accessory Designer 
    Dinny Hall
  
      Photographer of the Year
    Eamonn McCabe
  
      Glamour Designer
    Anthony Price
  
  <tr>   
   
</table>

1988 awards 
<table class="wikitable" style="font-size:90%; text-align:left">
      Award
    Winner
  
     Designer of the Year 
    Rifat Ozbek
  </tr></table>

1987 awards 
<table class="wikitable" style="font-size:90%; text-align:left">
      Award
    Winner
  
     Designer of the Year 
    John Galliano
  </tr></table>

1986 awards 
<table class="wikitable" style="font-size:90%; text-align:left">
      Award
    Winner
  
     Designer of the Year 
    Jasper Conran
  </tr></table>

1985 awards 
<table class="wikitable" style="font-size:90%; text-align:left">
      Award
    Winner
  
     Designer of the Year 
    Betty Jackson
  </tr></table>

1984 awards 
<table class="wikitable" style="font-size:90%; text-align:left">
      Award
    Winner
  
     Designer of the Year 
    Katherine Hamnett
  </tr></table>

Host, location, and sponsors by year

See also

 List of fashion awards

References

External links
 BFC Official Website

British awards
British fashion
Fashion awards
Fashion events in the United Kingdom
Annual events in the United Kingdom
1989 establishments in the United Kingdom
Awards established in 1989
Recurring events established in 1989